Libor is a Czech masculine given name of Latin origin, derived from libare 'sacrifice' or from word liborius free.

Nicknames 
Libby, Liborek, Borek

People with name Libor 

Libor Hajek - (Born 1998), Czech professional ice hockey player
Libor Došek - Czech footballer
Libor Sionko - (born 1977), Czech footballer
Libor Nováček - Czech pianist
Libor Pešek - Czech dirigent
Libor Rouček - Czech politician
Libor Zábranský (disambiguation), several people
Libor Pimek (born 1963), Czech and Belgian tennis player
Libor Polášek - Czech hockey player
Libor Procházka - Czech hockey player
Libor Charfreitag (born 1977) Slovak athlete
Libor Capalini - Czech athlete
Libor Malina - Czech athlete
Libor Radimec - Czechoslovak footballer
Libor Žůrek - Czech footballer
Libor Pivko - Czech hockey player

See also
Libor (disambiguation)
Liborius (disambiguation)

Articles 
All pages beginning with Libor

Masculine given names
Czech masculine given names